Lilla Akademien is a school founded 1994. The school focuses mostly on developing musical talent in children. It is located in Stockholm, Sweden.

History

Lilla Akademien, translated as "The Junior Academy", specializes in classical, jazz, and to a degree, folk music. Housed in a historic building in the Stockholm district Norrmalm, it was founded in 1994 by a group of music teachers.

In its early years, it provided instrumental tuition for young children, but since 1998 it offers full-time tuition in music and regular schooling for children from 6 years and up into adolescence. It eventually expanded to include a gymnasium or senior high school, and in 2005 the first graduates got their high school diplomas.

In 2006 Lilla Akademien opened a post-gymnasial 'Pre-College' one-year programme. 

Today, Lilla Akademien offers lessons and courses in the majority of orchestral instruments. Students also receive theoretical musical education, ear training, and lessons in music history and music analysis. It has multiple ensembles and orchestras, which have been on many international tours and have received large critical acclaim.

External links
 Lilla Akademien

References

Schools in Sweden
Educational institutions established in 1994
Gymnasiums (school) in Sweden
Music schools in Sweden
Schools in Stockholm
1994 establishments in Sweden